The Bachelor of Liberal Arts (BLA or ALB) is the title of an undergraduate bachelor's degree. Generally, it is awarded to students who major in liberal arts, pursue interdisciplinary studies, or design their own concentrations.

Often a Bachelor of Liberal Arts degree is undertaken with the help of a faculty advisor. A candidate designs a unique course of study that sometimes culminates in a thesis or capstone project. A Bachelor's in Liberal Arts allows students to pursue multiple fields in the form of a dual major or a minor in a certain field.

Harvard Extension School awards the Bachelor of Liberal Arts in Extension Studies degree to completion of its degree program.

In 2022, Georgetown University began to offer a BLA to people incarcerated at the Patuxent Institution in Jessup, Maryland through the Georgetown Prisons and Justice Initiative, with an inaugural class of 25 students.

References

Liberal Arts, Bachelor